The Fantasy 411 is a Major League Baseball radio and television broadcast on MLB.com. The hosts are primarily Mike Siano, Cory Schwartz, Casey Stern, fantasy sports guru Broadway CJ Reo and Zach Simon, with occasional contributions from Vinny Micucci, Brandon Costa, Will Carroll and Joe Sheehan of Baseball Prospectus. Jeffrey Ma of Protrade joins the show every Thursday at 12:40 p.m. The show airs Monday through Friday, from 2 to 3 p.m. ET, during the MLB season. The show's main focus is fantasy baseball. Schwartz and Siano answer fans' questions through calls, e-mails or instant messages. In the offseason the Fantasy 411 airs once a week until the end of February, after which it airs twice a week. The show can be downloaded as a podcast through MLB.com or iTunes. The archives of the show are available through MLB.com.

Mike Siano and Cory Schwartz are New Yorkers who both vehemently support the Yankees. One caller dubbed the Fantasy 411 as "infotainment" because the show combines much good fantasy baseball information while entertaining with pop culture references.

References

External links
https://web.archive.org/web/20060820071000/http://fantasy411.mlblogs.com/mlbcoms_fantasy_411/ The Fantasy 411 Blog
http://mlb.mlb.com/NASApp/mlb/mlb/audio/podcast/index.jsp MLB Radio Podcasts
http://www.mlb.com/NASApp/mlb/scripts/mediaplayer/mp_tpl.jsp?w=2006/open/mlbr06/show_archive/411/041406_fantasy411.wma    Infamous feud between Schwartz and Siano between Brian Bannister and Félix Hernández.
http://www.athomeplate.com/interviewschwartz.shtml A 2005 interview with Schwartz on AtHomePlate.com
http://www.mlb.com/NASApp/mlb/mlb/fantasy/mlb_fantasy_columns.jsp?story=insider0515 Schwartz's 2003 article on plate discipline

Major League Baseball on the radio
Fantasy sports